The Ministry of Foreign Affairs is the Sudanese cabinet ministry which oversees the foreign relations of Sudan.

List of ministers
This is a list of Ministers of Foreign Affairs of Sudan:

See also
Cabinet of Sudan

References

External links
 Ministry of Foreign Affairs

Foreign Affairs
Foreign relations of Sudan
Sudan, Foreign Affairs
Sudan